Scotinotylus dubiosus is a species of sheet weaver found in the United States. It was described by Millidge in 1981.

References

Linyphiidae
Endemic fauna of the United States
Spiders of the United States
Spiders described in 1981